DnaJ homolog subfamily B member 4 is a protein that in humans is encoded by the DNAJB4 gene.

References

Further reading

Heat shock proteins